Wild Decembers is a novel by Edna O'Brien. It is set in western Ireland in the 1970s, and was later made into a TV series.

References

1999 Irish novels
Novels by Edna O'Brien
Novels set in Ireland
Weidenfeld & Nicolson books
Fiction set in the 1970s
Irish historical novels